Nikola Kuljača (born 16 August 1974 in Belgrade, Serbia, SFR Yugoslavia) is a Serbian water polo goalkeeper who played for the team of Federal Republic of Yugoslavia/Serbia and Montenegro on the bronze medal squad at the 2000 Summer Olympics and the silver medal squad at the 2004 Summer Olympics.

See also
 Serbia and Montenegro men's Olympic water polo team records and statistics
 List of Olympic medalists in water polo (men)
 List of men's Olympic water polo tournament goalkeepers
 List of World Aquatics Championships medalists in water polo

References
 Serbian Olympic Committee

External links
 

1974 births
Living people
Serbian male water polo players
Serbia and Montenegro male water polo players
Yugoslav male water polo players
Water polo goalkeepers
Water polo players at the 2000 Summer Olympics
Water polo players at the 2004 Summer Olympics
Olympic water polo players of Yugoslavia
Olympic water polo players of Serbia and Montenegro
Olympic bronze medalists for Federal Republic of Yugoslavia
Olympic silver medalists for Serbia and Montenegro
Sportspeople from Belgrade
Olympic medalists in water polo
World Aquatics Championships medalists in water polo
Medalists at the 2004 Summer Olympics
Medalists at the 2000 Summer Olympics
Mediterranean Games gold medalists for Yugoslavia
Competitors at the 1997 Mediterranean Games
Mediterranean Games medalists in water polo